John H. Anderson was an American assistant director, second unit director and often part of the art department on films that he worked on, primarily as set decorator. He was nominated for an Academy Award in the category Best Art Direction for the film Witness.

Selected filmography
 Witness (1985)

References

External links

American set decorators
Place of birth missing
1920 births
2008 deaths